Nancy J. Nersessian is the Regents' Professor and Professor of Cognitive Science at the Georgia Institute of Technology. Her work tends to be in the areas of the philosophy of science, the history of science, and the psychology of science.

She has been a foreign member of the Royal Netherlands Academy of Arts and Sciences since 2006.

Works
Creating Scientific Concepts (MIT Press, 2008), 
Model-Based Reasoning: Science, Technology, and Values (edited with L. Magnani; Kluwer 2001), 
Model-Based Reasoning in Scientific Discovery (edited with L. Magnani and P. Thagard; Plenum 1999), 
Faraday to Einstein: Constructing Meaning in Scientific Theories (Kluwer, 1984, 1990),

References

External links
 Her faculty page at Georgia Tech

Living people
Year of birth missing (living people)
Georgia Tech faculty
Members of the Royal Netherlands Academy of Arts and Sciences
Fellows of the Cognitive Science Society